Taxagifine is a taxane isolated from Taxus.

Notes 

Acetate esters
Cinnamate esters
Taxanes
Diterpenes
Ketones
Tertiary alcohols
Vinylidene compounds